The Tricky Game of Love is a Czech comedy film directed by Jiří Krejčík. Consisted of two sequences, the work was released on October 22, 1971 in Czechoslovakia.

Cast
Giovanni Boccaccio - "Arabský kůň"
 Božidara Turzonovová - Sandra Vergellesi 
 Miloš Kopecký - Francesco Vergellesi
 Jozef Adamovič - Ricciardo Minutolo 
 Josef Chvalina - nobleman 
 Jan Přeučil - messenger
 Oldřich Velen - nobleman 
 Jaroslav Blažek - nobleman  
 Radko Chromek - jeweler
 Ilona Jirotková - Bianca, chambermaid 
 Gustav Opočenský - fashioner
 Jan Trávníček - servant
 Jiří Vašků - nobleman  
 Luděk Munzar - narrator 

Markéta Navarrská - "Náušnice"
 Jiří Sovák - The Count
 Slávka Budínová - The Countess
 Magda Vašáryová - chambermaid 
 Pavel Landovský - servant

References
General

External links
 

1971 films
Czechoslovak comedy films
Czech comedy films
1971 comedy films
Films based on works by Giovanni Boccaccio
Films set in the 14th century
1970s Czech films